In Greek mythology, the Nysiads or Nysiades (Ancient Greek: Νυσιάδες) were Okeanid nymphs of mythical Mount Nysa. Zeus entrusted the infant god Dionysus to their care, and the Nysiads raised him with the assistance of the old satyr-god Seilenos. When Dionysus was grown the Nysiads joined his company as the first of the Bakkhantes.

Names 
The names of the nymphs include:
 Ambrosia
 Arsinoe
 Bromia or Bromis
 Cisseis
 Coronis
 Erato
 Eriphia
 Nysa
 Pedile
 Polymno or Polyhymno

Also mentioned are Callichore and Calyce (after whom two moons of Jupiter, Kallichore and Kalyke, are named).

In later tellings of Dionysus's infancy, the Nysiades appear to be identified with the Hyades. The term might have been used for the Pleiades and the Hyades as Dionysus's tutors altogether.

Notes

References 

 Apollodorus, The Library with an English Translation by Sir James George Frazer, F.B.A., F.R.S. in 2 Volumes, Cambridge, MA, Harvard University Press; London, William Heinemann Ltd. 1921. ISBN 0-674-99135-4. Online version at the Perseus Digital Library. Greek text available from the same website.
 Diodorus Siculus, The Library of History translated by Charles Henry Oldfather. Twelve volumes. Loeb Classical Library. Cambridge, Massachusetts: Harvard University Press; London: William Heinemann, Ltd. 1989. Vol. 3. Books 4.59–8. Online version at Bill Thayer's Web Site
 Diodorus Siculus, Bibliotheca Historica. Vol 1-2. Immanel Bekker. Ludwig Dindorf. Friedrich Vogel. in aedibus B. G. Teubneri. Leipzig. 1888-1890. Greek text available at the Perseus Digital Library.
 Gaius Julius Hyginus, Fabulae from The Myths of Hyginus translated and edited by Mary Grant. University of Kansas Publications in Humanistic Studies. Online version at the Topos Text Project.
 The Homeric Hymns and Homerica with an English Translation by Hugh G. Evelyn-White. Homeric Hymns. Cambridge, MA.,Harvard University Press; London, William Heinemann Ltd. 1914. Online version at the Perseus Digital Library. Greek text available from the same website.
 Nonnus of Panopolis, Dionysiaca translated by William Henry Denham Rouse (1863-1950), from the Loeb Classical Library, Cambridge, MA, Harvard University Press, 1940.  Online version at the Topos Text Project.
 Nonnus of Panopolis, Dionysiaca. 3 Vols. W.H.D. Rouse. Cambridge, MA., Harvard University Press; London, William Heinemann, Ltd. 1940-1942. Greek text available at the Perseus Digital Library.

Oceanids
Greek goddesses
Dionysus in mythology